BAE Systems Australia, a subsidiary of BAE Systems plc, is one of the largest defence contractors in Australia. It was formed by the merger of British Aerospace Australia and GEC-Marconi Systems and expanded by the acquisitions of Armor Holdings in 2007 and Tenix Defence in June 2008.

History

BAE Systems' Australian heritage dates back to testing of the first generation air defence missile systems at the Woomera Test Range in the early 1950s. Weapons testing at Woomera began in 1953 by the Bristol Aeroplane Company and the English Electric Company. Both companies merged to become the British Aircraft Corporation (BAC). In 1977, BAC was nationalised and operations in Australia were renamed British Aerospace Australia.

British Aerospace Australia doubled in size in April 1996 with the purchase of AWA Defence Industries (AWADI). AWADI was formed in October 1988 by the merger of the defence electronics business of AWA Ltd, Thorn EMI Electronics Australia and Fairey Australasia.

BAE Systems was formed on 30 November 1999, following the merger of British Aerospace with the General Electric Company's (GEC) defence arm, Marconi Electronic Systems. BAE Systems Australia expanded with its parent company's acquisition of Armor Holdings in 2007 and doubled in size with the purchase of Tenix Defence in June 2008.

Products and services
BAE Systems Australia provides many products and services to the Australian Defence Force (ADF) including: Fast Jet support, Military Flight Training, Autonomous Systems, Guided Weapons (naval air defence) and Communications, Command & Support.

BAE Systems Australia operates two business units: Aerospace and Maritime & Integrated Systems (M&IS).

Naval
BAE Systems inherited the  project from Tenix Defence.

On 22 October 2008, BAE Systems was selected to continue with the Royal Australian Navy's Guided Missile Frigate Maintenance Contract (FFG IMS). BAE Systems replaced the existing company Thales Australia on 1 January 2009. This contract is expected to run until the last guided missile frigate is decommissioned in 2021.

BAE Systems' bid for work on the s was rejected in May 2009, when the Air Warfare Destroyer Alliance subcontracted 70% of construction of the destroyers to NQEA Australia and the Forgacs Group. However, on 29 June 2009, the work allocated to NQEA was transferred to BAE Systems Australia due to the former being unable to meet its financial obligations to the project. BAE Systems will build a total of 36 blocks for the three destroyers at its Williamstown shipyard. These are the hull machinery compartments, and bow and stern sections of the ships.

BAE Systems was announced on 29 June 2018 as the preferred tenderer to build the s, through ASC Shipbuilding and building the nine ships in South Australia.

ASC Shipbuilding was acquired by BAE Systems in December 2018, and renamed to BAE Systems Maritime Australia in 2021.

Corporate and community
BAE Systems Australia is headquartered at Edinburgh Parks, South Australia.  the company employs approximately 4,000 people Australia-wide. BAE Systems Australia's partner charity since 2015 is Soldier On with whom they work to support the health, employment and rehabilitation of Australia's veterans, service personnel and their families.

References

External links
Official site of BAE Systems 

BAE Systems subsidiaries and divisions
Defence companies of Australia
Manufacturing companies established in 1953
Manufacturing companies based in Adelaide
Australian subsidiaries of foreign companies
Aerospace companies of Australia